Semyon Sergeyevich Babintsev (born October 8, 1994) is a Russian professional ice hockey right winger who is currently playing for the Fort Wayne Komets of the ECHL.

Playing career
Babintsev played three seasons at junior level with the Mississauga Steelheads of the Ontario Hockey League before joining Nomad Astana of the Kazakhstan Hockey Championship in 2015. In the 2016-17 season, Babintsev played in the Kontinental Hockey League for HC Sochi and in the Czech Extraliga for HC Litvínov.

After a spell with Sokol Krasnoyarsk of the Supreme Hockey League, Babintsev signed for the Utah Grizzlies of the ECHL on February 13, 2018. On August 14, 2018, Babintsev signed with ECHL expansion team the Newfoundland Growlers. He was released from the team on March 11, 2019.

Following two seasons in China and Poland, Babintsev returned to North America and the ECHL, linking up with defending champions the Fort Wayne Komets on 26 August 2021.

References

External links

1994 births
Living people
HC Litvínov players
Mississauga Steelheads players
HC Most players
Newfoundland Growlers players
Nomad Astana players
Podhale Nowy Targ players
Russian ice hockey right wingers
HC Sochi players
Sokol Krasnoyarsk players
Ice hockey people from Moscow
Utah Grizzlies (ECHL) players
Russian expatriate sportspeople in the United States
Russian expatriate sportspeople in Canada
Russian expatriate sportspeople in the Czech Republic
Russian expatriate sportspeople in Kazakhstan
Russian expatriate sportspeople in China
Russian expatriate sportspeople in Poland
Expatriate ice hockey players in the United States
Expatriate ice hockey players in Canada
Expatriate ice hockey players in the Czech Republic
Expatriate ice hockey players in Kazakhstan
Expatriate ice hockey players in China
Expatriate ice hockey players in Poland
Russian expatriate ice hockey people